Hong Kong Flower Show is an annual exhibition presented by the Leisure and Cultural Services Department (LCSD) of Hong Kong.  It is held every March in Victoria Park.

From 1968 to 1986, the Urban Council held an Annual Urban Council Flower Show at City Hall, while the  Regional Council held the North District Flower Show. In May 1986, the Urban Council and Regional Council decided to have a joint annual flower show, and so in 1987, the first Hong Kong Flower Show was held in Sha Tin Central Park. After that, the flower show was jointly organised by the Urban Council and the Regional Council, with the location alternating between Victoria Park and Sha Tin Central Park. In 2000, the Hong Kong government decided to change the organizer to the newly-established LCSD and the location was fixed to be Victoria Park.

Theme and Featured Flower in Past Years

External links 

 

Flower shows
Trade fairs in Hong Kong